David Martin King (born 18 September 1962) is an English former professional footballer who played as a midfielder in the Football League for York City, in non-League football for Gresley Rovers, in New Zealand for Napier City Rovers, and was on the books of Derby County without making a league appearance.

References

1962 births
Living people
Sportspeople from Colchester
English footballers
Association football midfielders
Derby County F.C. players
Napier City Rovers FC players
Gresley F.C. players
York City F.C. players
English Football League players